Tito Paris, (born Aristides Paris 30 May 1963) is a Cape Verdean singer and musician (mainly guitar and bass). Aged 19, he moved to Portugal. Lisbon continues to be his home town.

Biography
He was born in Mindelo on the island of São Vicente to a family with many elements dedicated to that form of music.  He played with his brothers and his cousin Bau who later became famous.  He was influenced with music by clarinetists Luis Morais, Valdemar Lopes da Serra and Chico Serra.

He recorded and released his first album Fidjo Malguado in 1978, an instrumental work that relieves its virtuosity with a guitarist.  At 19 years of age, Tito Paris later moved to Lisbon under the request by Bana, he wanted to play the bass guitar. In Portugal, he took part of the band named Os Gaiatos in 1980 and recorded in Portugal as an exile band from 1982 to 1985.  He recorded his album Tito Paris in 1987, he also recorded with Cesária Évora in an LP titled Cesária.  Later on, he formed a main group which recorded the album Dança Ma Mi criola in 1993.  In 1996, he recorded his third album Graça de Tchega.  Afterwards, he released two live albums, one about B. Leza in 1998 and the other was recorded on 27 July 1990, released in 1999.  In 2002, he released his new album Guilhermina, his two Acústico albums were released, the first was Aula Magna released in 2004 which was the African edition and the second was the African edition in 2007.  His recent album is titled Mozamverde which featured tracks with musical styles of Cape Verde and Mozambique.  Most of the albums were released on the Paris-based record company Lusafrica.

He paid tribute to Miguel Portas at Teatros Luiz in Lisbon, where he sang a song titled "Sodade", originally sung by Cesária Évora.  As a composer, he also wrote songs for Bana and Cesária Evora.

Tito Paris has toured numerous nations including Portugal, Spain, France especially Cannes, New York City and Boston in the United States, Canada, England, the Netherlands, Brussels in Belgium and Norway.

In 2012, he celebrated 30 years of his career, with a huge concert in Rotterdam with the Metropolitan Orchestra of the Netherlands, a launch of a photobiography together with a documentary.

On 8 April 2017, he was awarded the rank of the Commander of the Portuguese Order of Merit by President Marcelo Rebelo de Sousa Not long after, he released a new album titled Mim ê Bô, which features with the special presentation of the former King of Morna Bana, as well as Boss AC and the Brazilian musician Zeca Baleiro.

Discography

References

Audio clip
 Audio clip (60 minutes): Cesaria Evora, Bau and Tito Paris. BBC Radio 3, accessed November 26, 2010.

Further reading
Sabrina Requedaz et Laurent Delucchi, Cap-Vert (Cape Verde), Olizane, Geneva, 2011 (6th ed.), p. 70

External links 

Tito Paris profile at Allmusic
 Official homepage
 Blog about Tito Paris
 Tito Paris at the Lusafrica Records page 
Article at the University of Hildesheim 
 Tito Paris in Russia
 Press cuts (in various languages)

1963 births
Living people
Cape Verdean musicians
People from Mindelo
Singers from São Vicente, Cape Verde
Commanders of the Order of Merit (Portugal)